Schuyler Erle is a free software developer and activist. He also works in the fields of digital cartography, wireless networking, intelligent search engines and the Semantic Web. He was the lead developer of NoCatAuth which is an open source wireless captive portal.  Erle grew up in Philadelphia and Springfield, PA and after graduating from Springfield High School in 1995, went on to earn his degree at Temple University.  He has created the popular games Balance of Power and Squigby.

Schuyler has worked for O'Reilly Media, MetaCarta (where he and Chris Schmidt created OpenLayers, and worked for SimpleGeo until their merger with UrbanAirship.

Schuyler currently lives in San Francisco, CA and travels frequently giving workshops on do it yourself cartography.

References

Bibliography

External links
 Short biography
 http://nocat.net/
 Talk on The Democratization of Cartography given to NUUG in 2006

Living people
Free software programmers
Erle, Schuyler
Year of birth missing (living people)